Joseph Rollino (March 19, 1905 – January 11, 2010) was a decorated World War II veteran, weightlifter, and strongman. The son of Italian immigrants, Rollino dubbed himself the world's strongest man in the 1920s, moving  with his back during the prime of his career.

Early life and career
Rollino was born and raised in Coney Island, Brooklyn, New York, one of 14 children. He also took up boxing and toured the US as a boxer, fighting under the name Kid Dundee.

Rollino also became known as a strongman, moving more than a ton, bending nails with his mouth and coins with his bare hands. He often appeared on the Coney Island Festival in the 1920s and 30s, being dubbed the world's strongest man. Rollino boasted of lifting  with one finger. He once lifted  with his teeth.

After retiring from active performing, he worked as a longshoreman and once worked as a bodyguard for Greta Garbo. Rollino was a lifelong and "devout" vegetarian. During his later years, he was known for his winter swimming activities. Rollino was part of the Iceberg Athletic Club, a now-defunct swimming club, for more than 20 years.

Military service 
He fought in the Pacific during World War II, and was awarded a Silver Star, a Bronze Star Medal, and three Purple Hearts. "He saw that his men were really hurting, getting injured during a battle", Pete Spanakos said, "so he ran onto the field, grabbed two men under one arm, two under another, and brought them back behind the lines. And he did this several times."

Retirement
Rollino lived a life of relative obscurity, rarely giving interviews or appearing in public. In a 2008 interview, he claimed to have been "born strong". He was married briefly early in his life and then divorced. He later lived with a niece. According to friends and family, he was in very good shape and was still able to bend quarters with his teeth as of his claimed 103rd birthday.

Death
On January 11, 2010, Rollino left his home and was hit by a vehicle in Dyker Heights, Brooklyn. He died at a hospital several hours later, aged 104.

References

External links
 "Joe Rolino: At 103, Still Fit, Fiery" by Robert Mladinich, March 23, 2008

1905 births
2010 deaths
American male boxers
American male weightlifters
Boxers from New York City
American centenarians
American military personnel of World War II
American people of Italian descent
Pedestrian road incident deaths
Sportspeople from Brooklyn
Recipients of the Silver Star
Road incident deaths in New York City
American strength athletes
People associated with physical culture
People from Coney Island
People from Dyker Heights, Brooklyn
Vegetarianism activists
Men centenarians
Military personnel from New York City